Zir Asef (also Romanized as Zīr Āsef) is a village in Aghmiyun Rural District, in the Central District of Sarab County, East Azerbaijan Province, Iran. At the 2006 census, its population was 116, in 26 families.

References 

Populated places in Sarab County